Scott Timberg (February 15, 1969 – December 10, 2019) was an American journalist, culture writer, and editor. He was best known as an authority on southern California culture and for his book Culture Crash: The Killing of the Creative Class.

Early life
Scott Robert Timberg was born in Palo Alto, California, son of journalist and author Robert Timberg and Jane Timberg. He was raised in Maryland. Timberg earned a Bachelor of Arts from Wesleyan University in 1991 and a master’s degree in journalism from the University of North Carolina at Chapel Hill. He attended a term abroad at the University of Sussex.  His grandfather was composer Sammy Timberg and his great uncle was vaudevillian Herman Timberg.

Career
Timberg started his journalism career at The Day (New London) in Connecticut. He moved to Los Angeles in 1997 to join the staff of New Times LA. He was a long-time staff writer for the Los Angeles Times until 2008 and a staff writer for Salon. As a freelancer he wrote for the Los Angeles Review of Books, The New York Times and Los Angeles Magazine, among others. Timberg spent the longest period of his life in Los Angeles, with a year in Athens, Georgia in 2015.

Books 

 The Misread City: New Literary Los Angeles (editor, with Dana Gioia) (2003)
 Culture Crash: The Killing of the Creative Class (2015) 
 Beeswing: Fairport, Folk Rock and Finding My Voice, 1967–75 (co-written with Richard Thompson) (2021)

Writings About Scott Timberg 

 Various, Remembering Scott Timberg (Los Angeles Review of Books) (2019)
 Christopher Reynolds, Scott Timberg, spirited listener, reader and writer is dead at 50 (LA Times) (2019)
 Dana Gioia, Scott Timberg: a bitter symbol for those who have been marginalized by our “creative culture" (The Book Haven) (2019)

Awards 
Timberg's book Culture Crash: The Killing of the Creative Class won the National Arts & Entertainment Journalism Award in 2015. The New Yorker called it "a quietly radical rethinking of the very nature of art in modern life".

Personal life and death
Timberg married Sara Scribner, a school librarian and journalist, and they have one son.

Timberg committed suicide on December 10, 2019, in Los Angeles, at the age of 50.

References

External links
 Timberg's blog CultureCrash

1969 births
2019 suicides
21st-century American non-fiction writers
American bloggers
American male journalists
American people of Austrian-Jewish descent
Journalists from California
Los Angeles Times people
People from Stanford, California
Place of death missing
University of North Carolina at Chapel Hill alumni
Writers from Los Angeles
Wesleyan University alumni
21st-century American male writers
2019 deaths
Suicides in California